Nishatabad railway station is located in Nishatabad town, Faisalabad district of Punjab province, Pakistan.

Nishatabad railway station serves the locals of Mansoorabad, Nishatabad, Gulistan colony and adjoining areas. A branch line also goes to GENCO III, combined cycle power station of Faisalabad to supply liquid fuel to the plant.

See also
 List of railway stations in Pakistan
 Pakistan Railways

References

External links

Railway stations in Faisalabad District
Railway stations on Khanewal–Wazirabad Line